Hollywood Casino Hotel & Raceway Bangor (previously Hollywood Slots and Bangor Raceway) is a casino and harness racing track in Bangor, Maine. It is owned by Gaming and Leisure Properties and operated by Penn Entertainment. It was the first licensed slots facility in the state, and became the first casino to be licensed in the state of Maine when it added table games to its facilities in 2012. The only other licensed casino in the state is Oxford Casino in Oxford, Maine. As of 2021, the casino had 12 tables and 723 slot machines. The hotel has 152 rooms, including four suites.

Taxes on the casino's revenue contributed approximately $12 million to the City of Bangor's construction of the Cross Insurance Center, located across the street from the Casino. Eastern Maine Community College now offers classes to students on how to deal for various casino card games, which are partially sponsored by the casino.

History 
The property became a racino when Penn National Gaming (now Penn Entertainment) acquired Bangor Historic Track and its slots license from casino developer Shawn Scott following a statewide referendum the approving slots gaming at parimutuel racing facilities.  Penn National initially acquired a nearby local restaurant and converted it into a temporary facility housing 475 slot machines, as well as off-track betting, while construction began on a larger facility across the street on the Penobscot River. In 2007, the casino moved into the new facility and expanded to house 1,000 slot machines. In 2012, Penn National was allowed to add traditional casino table games to its collection of slots.

See also 
 Gambling in Maine

References

External links 
 

Casinos in Maine
Casino hotels